Shankar P. Bhattacharyya (born 1946), is an American engineer. He is a professor at the College of Engineering of the Texas A&M University (TAMU), and is active in the field of automatic control systems. Since December 2011, he has been a foreign member of Brazilian Academy of Sciences.

Awards 
 Fellow Award - International Federation of Automatic Control (IFAC), 2011.

References

External links 
 

Living people
1971 births
21st-century American engineers
Texas A&M University faculty